The Online Film Critics Society Award for Special Achievement is an annual film award given by the Online Film Critics Society.

Special Awards (1999, 2012-Present)

1999
Internet Movie Database

2011
To Jessica Chastain, the breakout performer of the year
To Martin Scorsese, in honor of his work and dedication to the pursuit of film preservation

2012
Career Achievement Award: Ennio Morricone
To "For the Love of Film" bloggers and Fandor – in conjunction with the National Film Preservation Foundation – for making the surviving portion of the silent film – “The White Shadow” – available for free online viewing throughout the world. the film is significant as work by Alfred Hitchcock just prior to his directorial debut. the preservation and presentation were made possible primarily by the community of online film critics.
To Mojtaba Mirtahmasb & Jafar Panahi – for making This Is Not a Film as a vital act of protest against the Iranian authorities.

2013
Best Sound Design: Gravity
Best Visual Effects: Gravity
To Roger Ebert, for inspiring so many of our members

Online Film Critics Society Awards
Lists of films by award